Steinitz's theorem may refer to any of the following results by German mathematician Ernst Steinitz (1871–1928):
Steinitz's theorem on the graphs of three-dimensional convex polyhedra
Steinitz exchange lemma on bases of finite-dimensional vector spaces
Lévy–Steinitz theorem on the convergence of rearranged infinite series of vectors
Several variations of Carathéodory's theorem (convex hull) on the enclosure of points in the convex hulls of other points